Steven Ilous (born 2 June 1981) is an entrepreneur, director, writer, and producer. He is the leading founder and CEO of The Feature Inc.. He is best known for his expertise in computer graphics, virtual production, and visual effects, having worked in the visual effects department on over 18 films, including The Matrix Reloaded, The Matrix Revolutions and The Polar Express.

In early 2015, Ilous's short film Polis won New Regency and Defy Media's PROTOTYPE competition. As a result, he was awarded a first look development deal at New Regency.

The Superslice listed Ilous 25th on their list of the Top 100 cultural influencers of 2012.

Steven Ilous is based in Los Angeles, California.

Career 

Ilous has worked independently as well as for some of the leading film makers including Sony Imageworks, New Regency, Legendary, Warner Bros, DreamWorks and 20th Century Fox.

He began in visual effects at the age of 18 working with Stan Lee at Stan Lee Media, where he became a Senior Animator. He was part of a core team to produce the first ever webisodic animated series using Macromedia Flash. One year later, he became a part of the visual effects team on The Matrix Reloaded and The Matrix Revolutions. In 2004, Ilous helped create facial motion capture technology used in The Polar Express, Monster House, and Beowulf.

In 2008, Ilous teamed up with Michael Davidoff, Bill Rosenthal, and Steve Freeman to write The Life and Times of Jimmy Jaxx for 20th Century Fox, an animated series loosely based on the life of Tommy Lee. Ilous then made his directorial debut in commercials with the World of Tanks video game teaser for Gamescom 2011. The video has received over 10 million YouTube views and took 60 artists 60 days to create. He has also directed and produced music videos for Electric Youth, Bloody Beetroots, Theophilous London, Gary Go, and Benny Benassi. His music videos have appeared on MTV, VH1, and CMT. Ilous also created original video content for Kanye West's live tour which debuted at Lollapalooza in 2011.

In November 2012, Ilous released a proof-of-concept teaser for his sci-fi feature film project 2088.  Described as "a visual style reminiscent of Blade Runner", Wired.com summarizes "The brief piece of “found footage” sells a gritty urban vision of the future, when cops from Los Angeles’ Non-Human Crimes Division get squashed by a Transformers-meets-King Kong robotic thug." Currently 2088 is in development as a feature-length movie.

In January 2015, New Regency and Defy Media announced Ilous and Daniel Perea the winners of their filmmaking competition PROTOTYPE. The two won with their 5-minute short film, Polis, a sci-fi thriller. The competition's prize was a development deal with New Regency, where Polis is to become a feature-length film. After viewing Polis, David Fincher signed on to produce. In early 2015 Polis became a Vimeo staff pick and was named "Short of the Week" at OneRoomwithaView.com in February 2015.

Filmography

Feature films

Short films 
 2088 (2012) (director, writer, editor, producer, visual effects)
 Polis (2014) (director, co-writer, editor, producer)

Television
 20th Century Fox Television Life and Times of Jimmy Jaxx (2008)  (Executive Producer, Co-Creator)

Commercials 
 Wargaming – World of Tanks (2011) 10 Million+ views
 Wargaming – World of Warplanes (2013)

Other credits 
 Driven (2001) (Visual Effects Sequence Designer)
 The Matrix Reloaded (2003) (Visual Effects)
 The Matrix Revolutions (2003) (Visual Effects)
 The Polar Express (2004) (Senior Technical Animator)
 All In (2006) (Visual Effects Supervisor)
 Trapped Ashes (2006) (Visual Effects Supervisor)
 Universal Remote (2007) (Visual Effects Supervisor)
 Stiletto (2007) (Visual Effects Supervisor)
 Watchmen (2009) (Visual Effects Supervisor: Digital Concepts Group)
 "Toxic is Dead" for Toxic Avenger (2009) (Director, Producer, Editor, Visual Effects )
 Thule - Short Film (2011) (Visual Effects Supervisor)
 Freerunner (2011) (Visual Effects Supervisor)
 Reign - Short Film (2012) (Visual Effects Supervisor)
 Breaking at the Edge (2013) (Visual Effects Supervisor)
 Savannah (2013) (Visual Effects Supervisor)
 "All the Girls feat. Theophilus London" for Bloody Beetroots (2013) (Director, Producer, Editor, Visual Effects)
 Similo - Short Film (2014) (Visual Effects Supervisor: SMI Entertainment)
 "Innocence" for Electric Youth (2014) (Producer, Visual Effects Supervisor)
 Now Was Once the Future - Short Film (2014) (Visual Effects Supervisor: SMI Entertainment)
 Baby Baby Baby (2015) (Visual Effects Supervisor: SMI Entertainment)

Public Speaking
Ilous has served as a guest lecturer at the USC School of Cinematic Arts along with DJ Hauck. He also acted as Gotland Games Awards judge and guest lecturer from 2009 to 2011 at Gotland University a division of Uppsala University in Sweden, an institution with the first video game education program in Northern Europe.

References

External links 
 
 Steven Ilous at IMVDb
 Steven Ilous at Vimeo

1981 births
Living people
American film directors
Visual effects artists